David Kent Vineyard (born February 25, 1941)  is an American former pitcher in Major League Baseball who played briefly for the Baltimore Orioles during the  season. He was born in Clay, West Virginia, and signed with the Cleveland Indians in 1959 after graduating from high school in Spencer. Baltimore selected him in the minor league draft after that season.

In his one season in the majors, Vineyard posted a 2–5 won–lost record with a 4.17 ERA in 19 pitching appearances, including six starts and one complete game. He allowed 34 runs (nine unearned) on 57 hits and 27 walks while striking out 50 in 54 innings of work.

His nine-year pro career ended in 1967.

External links
The Baseball Cube
Baseball Reference
Retrosheet

 

1941 births
Living people
Baltimore Orioles players
Baseball players from West Virginia
Elmira Pioneers players
Fox Cities Foxes players
Major League Baseball pitchers
North Platte Indians players
People from Clay, West Virginia
Rochester Red Wings players
Toronto Maple Leafs (International League) players
Vancouver Mounties players